The Pachaimalai Hills, (Tamil: பச்சைமலை), also known as the Pachais, are a low mountain range in the Eastern Ghats System. They are located in Perambalur district & Tiruchirapalli district of Tamil Nadu state, southeastern India. It is situated at a distance of 10 km from Perambalur, 73 km from Trichy and 112 km from Salem. The Tamil Nadu Government is planning to develop the Pachaimalai as a tourist destination.

Etymology
In the Tamil language, Pachai means green. The range's vegetation is greener than some of the other hills in the region.

Geography
Rivers in the Pachaimalai Hills include the Sweata Nadi and Kallar River. Waterfalls include the Koraiyar Falls, Mangalam Aruvi falls, and Mayil Uthu falls.

The VeeraRamar Dam is located on the Kallar River in the hills. The main junctions are Sembulichampatty, Manalodai, ChinnaIluppur, Ramanadhapuram, Topsengattupatti, Sembur, Periyapakalam, Periya nagur, and Mayammbadi.

Indigenous tribes such as the Malayalis (not to be confused with malayali of kerala) trade some of their surplus agricultural products they grow in the hills, at towns on the plains for items not available in the hills. Jackfruit is a popular seasonal agriculture product from the hills. Mostly they holding the majority of land in their town. They are cultivating rice and sugarcane.
Top sengattuppatti is the main village of thenpuanadu. there are three divisional part of pachamalai hills 1) Vannadu, 2) Thenpuranadu, 3) Aaththinadu.

Nearby towns
Top Sengattuppatti is a major village in the range. Towns near the Pachaimalai Hills on the plains include:
Melapuliyur
Esanai
Elambalur
Perambalur
Gangavalli
Thammampatti
Arumbavur
Malayalappatti 
Thedavur 
Uppiliapuram
Attur
Aranarai And Thuraiyur

Districts
The Pachaimalai Hills are spread over the following districts of Tamil Nadu:

Tiruchirappalli District
Perambalur district
Salem district

References

Landforms of Tamil Nadu
Eastern Ghats
Mountain ranges of India